17 Field Artillery Regiment was a reserve South African Artillery unit.

History
17 Field Artillery Regiment was formed in 1975 as a Citizen Force unit in Pretoria.

It was a new artillery counter-insurgency unit whose purpose was to provide support for 73 Motorised Brigade from 1975 to 1991. 17 Field Artillery also assisted 81 Armoured Brigade.

17 Field was originally an offshoot of the Regiment University of Pretoria.

17 Field Artillery was also known as the Pretoria Artillery.

Artillery Type
The term Field Regiment was not quite descriptive of this unit which comprised a number of artillery elements such as field guns, medium mortars and a locating artillery element being essentially radar. It could also be referred to as a composite regiment.

Operations
17 Field Regiment  received indirect operational experience when it received experienced national servicemen returning from SWA and Angola. Members also did service as infantry in the operational area. The first actual operation duty for the regiment occurred in 1982 when a battery  under command of Capt H.J. Bootha was sent to Sector 70. Another battery was sent as well to Sector 10 as Infantry to fill a strength requirement for the Brigade. A battery under Commandant Botha was also sent to the border in Sector 10 in 1988. The expected operation did however not occur.

17 Field Regiment was eventually amalgamated into the Transvaalse Staatsartillerie in October 1991.

Commanders
Commandant M. van Rooyen
Commandant K.R.W. Harrison
Commandant A.H. van Tonder

Insignia

References

 Further reading: 

Artillery regiments of South Africa
Disbanded military units and formations in Pretoria
Military units and formations established in 1975
Artillery units and formations of South Africa
Military units and formations of South Africa in the Border War
Military units and formations disestablished in 1991